Keynote is a presentation software application developed as a part of the iWork productivity suite by Apple Inc. Version 10 of Keynote for Mac, the latest major update, was released in March 2020. On January 27, 2010, Apple announced a new version of Keynote for iPad with an all-new touch interface. It is now also available for the iPhone to download from the App Store.

History 
Keynote began as a computer program for Apple CEO Steve Jobs to use in creating the presentations for Macworld Conference and Expo and other Apple keynote events. Prior to using Keynote, Jobs had used Concurrence, from Lighthouse Design, a similar product which ran on the NeXTSTEP and OPENSTEP platforms.

The program was first sold publicly as Keynote 1.0 in 2003, competing against existing presentation software, most notably Microsoft PowerPoint.

In 2005, Apple began selling Keynote 2.0 in conjunction with Pages, a new word processing and page layout application, in a software package called iWork. At the Macworld Conference & Expo 2006, Apple released iWork '06 with updated versions of Keynote 3.0 and Pages 2.0. In addition to official HD compatibility, Keynote 3 added new features, including group scaling, 3D charts, multi-column text boxes, auto bullets in any text field, image adjustments, and free-form masking tools. In addition, Keynote features three-dimensional transitions, such as a rotating cube or a simple flip of the slide.

In the fall of 2007, Apple released Keynote 4.0 in iWork '08, along with Pages 3.0 and the new Numbers spreadsheet application.

On October 23, 2013, Apple redesigned Keynote with version 6.0, and made it free for anyone with a new iOS device or a recently purchased Mac.

Features 
 Themes that allow the user to keep consistency in colors and fonts throughout the presentation, including charts, graphs, and tables.
 OpenGL-powered 3D slide transitions and builds that resemble rolling cubes or flipping pages, or dissolving transitions that fade one slide into the next.
 Dual monitor support: the presenter can show the presentation on a screen and still see the desktop or notes from his laptop or presenter screen.
 Exports to: PDF, QuickTime, JPEG, TIFF, PNG, HTML (with JPEG images) and PowerPoint. Keynote also uses .key (presentation files) and .kth (theme files) bundles based on XML.
 Supports all QuickTime video formats (including MPEG-2 and DV) in slideshows.
 Version 3 brings export to iDVD with clickability.
 Compatibility with Apple Remote and the Keynote remote application for iPhone, iPad, and iPod Touch.

Keynote Remote 
Keynote Remote was an iOS application that controlled Keynote presentations from an iPhone, iPod Touch or iPad over a Wi-Fi network or Bluetooth connection and was released through the App Store.  With the release of Keynote for iOS, the app was integrated into the new Keynote application and the stand-alone app was withdrawn.

Version history

See also 
 Presentation program
 Slideshow
 Google Slides
 Microsoft PowerPoint
 OpenOffice.org Impress
 Pages
 Numbers
 iWork
 Office Open XML software
 Prezi
 Stevenote

References

External links 
  – official site
 Keynote free resources at iWork Community
 Keynote templates, shapes, and elements, free resource at KeynoteTemplate.com
 Keynote templates, free resource at Wisset.com

macOS-only software made by Apple Inc.
iOS-based software made by Apple Inc.
 Presentation software
 Technical communication tools
2003 software
Computer-related introductions in 2003